The 1986 FIFA World Cup qualification CONMEBOL Group 1 was a CONMEBOL qualifying group for the 1986 FIFA World Cup. The group comprised Argentina, Colombia, Peru and Venezuela.

The group was won by Argentina, who qualified for the 1986 FIFA World Cup. Peru and Colombia entered the CONMEBOL play-off stage.

Standings

Results

External links
Fifa.com page
Rsssf page
Results and Scorers

1986 FIFA World Cup qualification (CONMEBOL)
World